Parascombrops serratospinosus, the roughspine seabass is a species of fish in the family Acropomatidae, the lanternbellies. It is found in the Western Pacific commonly from Taiwan and the Philippines to northwestern Australia and Vanuatu but it is rare in the waters off Japan

References

serratospinosus
Fish described in 1912